Whitemouth is a community in the Rural Municipality of Whitemouth, located in southeastern Manitoba, Canada. The community is named after the Whitemouth River. It was established in 1905 along the main Canadian Pacific Railway line.

Demographics 

References

 

Designated places in Manitoba
Unincorporated communities in Eastman Region, Manitoba